The 1878 Men's tennis tour was composed of the third annual pre-open era tour. It now incorporated 15 tournaments staged in Great Britain and Ireland the Wimbledon championships was won by challenger Patrick Francis Hadow defeating the defending champion Spencer Gore.

It began in April in Newcastle Emlyn, Wales and ended in October in Bournemouth, Dorset, England.

Summary
This early pre open era tour began in April 1878 with Teifiside Lawn Tennis Club Tournament on grass played at Newcastle Emlyn, Wales the club is still open today. In May a spring tennis tournament was held at the Bournemouth Cricket and Lawn Tennis Club on Dean Park Cricket Ground, Bournemouth, England the club held a second event in October this year.

In July the most important event of the year the 1878 Wimbledon Championships was won by the challenger Patrick Francis Hadow who beat Spencer Gore in the all comers final. In August the inaugural Scottish Championships was won by James Patten MacDougall. In September at the inaugural County Wicklow Championships the tournament was won by a Captain Hughes. In September at the South of Ireland Championships held Wicklow in Ireland, the Limerick Cup was won by Vere St. Leger Goold.

Calendar 
Notes 1: Challenge round: the final round of a tournament, in which the winner of a single-elimination phase faces the previous year's champion, who plays only that one match. The challenge round was used in the early history of tennis (from 1877 through 1921), in some tournaments not all.* Indicates challenger
Notes 2:Tournaments in italics were events that were staged only once that season

Key

January to March
No events

April

May

July 

{| class="wikitable" style="font-size:85%;" 
|-
!width="75"|Date
!width="230"|Tournament
!width="210"|Winner
!width="210"|All comers' finalist
!width="170"|Semifinalist
!width="170"|Quarterfinalist
|-valign=top
|rowspan=2|July.||style="background:#d0f0c0" rowspan="2"|All Ireland Lawn Tennis ChampionshipsAll Ireland Lawn Tennis ClubChampion GroundLansdowne, Dublin, Ireland.GrassSingles||?   ||? ||   ||
|-valign=top
| ||
|-valign=top
|rowspan=2|12 July||Championship of the Esher LTC	Esher Lawn Tennis ClubEsher, Surrey, EnglandGrassSingles|| Clement Edward Cottrell ? ||? ||   || 
|-valign=top
| ||
|-valign=top
|rowspan=2| 9–19 July||style="background:#ffc;" rowspan=2|Wimbledon ChampionshipLondon, Great BritainGrassSingles || Patrick Francis Hadow6–4, 6–4, 6–4 || Lestocq Robert Erskine|| rowspan=2|  Herbert Lawford || rowspan=2|  Charles Gipps Hamilton Arthur Thomas Myers
|-valign=top
|Challenger round Spencer Gore7–5, 6–1, 9–7 ||
|-valign=top
| ||
|-valign=top
|rowspan=2|24 July.||Staffordshire County Cricket Club Lawn Tennis Tournament.Staffordshire County Cricket GroundLichfield, Staffordshire, EnglandGrassSingles|| Jonas Henry William Gardner? ||  ||   || 
|-valign=top
| ||
|-valign=top
|}

 August 

 September 

 October 

 November to December 
No events

 List of tournament winners Important tournament in bold  Patrick Francis Hadow – Wimbledon-(1)
  W.F. Templer – Armagh-(1)
  Edmond Bennet Brackenbury – Bournemouth 1st-(1)
  Sir Hubert James Medlycott – Bournemouth 2nd-(1)
  Henry Evelyn Tombe – Bromley-(1)
  James Jackson Sherrard – Dublin-(1)
  James Patten MacDougall – Edinburgh-(1)
  Clement Edward Cottrell– Esher-(1)
  Jonas Henry William Gardner–Lichfield-(1)
  William Henry Darby – Limerick-(1)
  Robert Baron Templer –Moy-(1)
  Gwyn Saunders – Newcastle Emlyn-(1)
  Rev. William Hughes – Newton Abbott-(1)
  Vere St. Leger Goold – Waterford-(1)

 Rankings Source:' The Concise History of Tennis, 6th edition, 2016

 See also 
 1878 Tennis Season
 1878 in sports

 References 

 Sources 

 A Social History of Tennis in Britain: Lake, Robert J. (2014), Volume 5 of Routledge Research in Sports History. Routledge, UK, . Ayre's Lawn Tennis Almanack And Tournament Guide, 1908 to 1938, A. Wallis Myers. British Lawn Tennis and Squash Magazine, 1948 to 1967, British Lawn Tennis Ltd, UK. Dunlop Lawn Tennis Almanack And Tournament Guide, G.P. Hughes, 1939 to 1958, Dunlop Sports Co. Ltd, UK Lawn tennis and Badminton Magazine, 1906 to 1973, UK. Lowe's Lawn Tennis Annuals and Compendia, Lowe, Sir F. Gordon, Eyre & Spottiswoode Spalding's Lawn Tennis Annuals from 1885 to 1922, American Sports Pub. Co, USA. Sports Around the World: History, Culture, and Practice, Nauright John and Parrish Charles, (2012), ABC-CLIO, Santa Barbara, Cal, USA, . The Concise History of Tennis, Mazak Karoly, (2010), 6th Edition, 2015. Tennis; A Cultural History, Gillmeister Heiner, (1997), Leicester University Press, Leicester, UK. The Tennis Book, edited by Michael Bartlett and Bob Gillen, Arbor House, New York, 1981  The World of Tennis Annuals, Barrett John, 1970 to 2001. Total Tennis:The Ultimate Tennis Encyclopedia, by Bud Collins, Sport Classic Books, Toronto, Canada,  Wright & Ditson Officially Adopted Lawn Tennis Guide's 1890 to 1920 Wright & Ditsons Publishers, Boston, Mass, USA. http://www.tennisarchives.com/ https://thetennisbase.com/''

External links 
 1878 Scottish Championships
 1878 South of Ireland Championships, The Limerick Cup Ireland 

1878
Men's Tennis Tour